GT Muscae, also known as 12 Muscae, is a variable star about 400 light years from the Earth, in the constellation Musca. It is a 5th magnitude star, so it should be faintly visible to the naked eye of an observer far from city lights. It is a quadruple star system, consisting of a spectroscopic binary containing an RS Canum Venaticorum variable (RS CVn) star (HD 101379), orbiting an eclipsing binary (HD 101380). It varies in brightness from magnitude 4.96 to 5.23. GT Muscae is a very active X-ray source.

In 1929, Willem van den Bos discovered that GT Muscae is a visual double star, whose A (HD 101379) and B (HD 101380) components were separated by 0.2 arc seconds at the time he observed it. Examining photographic plates in 1964, Wolfgang Strohmeier et al. discovered that GT Muscae is a variable star. In 1979, based on spectroscopic features,  Edward Weiler and Robert Stencel listed GT Muscae as a likely RS CVn variable. Eclipses of the HD 101380 pair were first reported by Andrew Collier Cameron in his 1982 PhD thesis, in which he also determined that pair's orbital period. The entire star system was given the variable star designation GT Muscae in 1988.

Strong, variable, 5 GHz radio emission from GT Muscae, indicative of flares, was detected in 1982 and was interpreted as indicating high levels of chromospheric and coronal activity.

GT Muscae was detected in the early observations of the Uhuru X-ray satellite, originally denoted as 2U 1134–161, later renamed 4U 1137–65. Michael Garcia et al. identified HD 101379 as the source seen by Uhuru, in 1980. During the 2010-2019 decade, GT Muscae showed the most X-ray flare activity of any star in the sky, producing flares with energies as high as ~1038 ergs.

References

Musca (constellation)
56862
101379
101380
Muscae, GT
4492
Algol variables
RS Canum Venaticorum variables
X-ray binaries
G-type giants
A-type main-sequence stars